A static web page (sometimes called a flat page or a stationary page) is a web page that is delivered to the user's web browser exactly as stored, in contrast to dynamic web pages which are generated by a web application.

Consequently, a static web page often displays the same information for all users, from all contexts, subject to modern capabilities of a web server to negotiate content-type or language of the document where such versions are available and the server is configured to do so. However, a webpage's javascript can introduce dynamic functionality which may make the static web page dynamic.

Overview
Static web pages are often HTML documents stored as files in the file system and made available by the web server over HTTP (nevertheless URLs ending with ".html" are not always static). However, loose interpretations of the term could include web pages stored in a database, and could even include pages formatted using a template and served through an application server, as long as the page served is unchanging and presented essentially as stored.

Static web pages are suitable for content that never or rarely needs to be updated, though modern web template systems are changing this. Maintaining large numbers of static pages as files can be impractical without automated tools, such as static site generators.  Any personalization or interactivity has to run client-side, which is restricting.

Advantages of a static website
 Provide improved security over dynamic websites (dynamic websites are at risk to web shell attacks if a vulnerability is present)
 Improved performance for end users compared to dynamic websites
 Fewer or no dependencies on systems such as databases or other application servers 
 Cost savings from utilizing cloud storage, as opposed to a hosted environment
 Security configurations are easy to setup, which makes it more secure

Disadvantages of a static website
 Dynamic functionality must be performed on the client side

Static site generators

Static site generators are applications that compile static websites - typically populating HTML templates in a predefined folder and file structure, with content supplied in a format such as MarkDown or Asciidoc.

Examples of static site generators include:
 Jekyll
 Hugo
 Next.js
 Pelican (Python)

References

External links 
 The definitive listing of Static Site Generators, a community-curated list of static site generators.

Web 1.0
Static website generators
Web development